ORP Orzeł was the lead ship of her class of submarines serving in the Polish Navy during World War II. Her name means "Eagle" in Polish. The boat is best known for the Orzeł incident, her escape from internment in neutral Estonia during the early stages of the Second World War.

Construction
Orzeł was laid down 14 August 1936 at the Dutch shipyard De Schelde, as the Job No. 205; launched on 15 January 1938, and commissioned on 2 February 1939. She was a modern design (designed by the joint venture of Polish and Dutch engineers), albeit quite large for the shallow waters of the Baltic Sea.

World War II

Polish Campaign

At the beginning of the invasion of Poland Orzeł was docked in Oksywie. As per the Worek Plan, the submarine was deployed on patrol in a designated strategic zone of the Baltic Sea. The crew received orders to attack the pre-dreadnought Schleswig-Holstein, should it leave Danzig. With the situation rapidly deteriorating, Orzel abandoned its sector on 4 September and began to withdraw into the Baltic Sea. The submarine was attacked by the German minesweepers M3 and M4, damaged but evaded destruction that evening.

Escape to Britain

 
Orzels crew decided to head to Tallinn, Estonia as a result of the damage. Orzeł reached Tallinn on 14 September 1939. On 15 September the captain, Lieutenant-Commander , was forced to leave the submarine to undergo hospital treatment for an unknown illness he had been suffering from since 8 September. Under the Hague Convention of 1907, section XIII, Article 12, "belligerent ships" could enter a neutral port but were forbidden from remaining there for "more than twenty-four hours." At the insistence of Germany, the Estonian military authorities boarded the ship, interned the crew, confiscated all the navigation aids and maps, and commenced removing all her armaments. However, only fifteen of her twenty torpedoes were removed before the hoist cable parted; this was because it had been secretly sabotaged by her new commander, former chief officer, Lieutenant Jan Grudzinski.

The crew of Orzeł conspired together to carry out a daring escape. Around midnight on 18 September, the submarine's Estonian guards were overpowered, the mooring lines were cut, and Orzeł got under way. The alarm was raised, and her conning tower was peppered by machine-gun fire. Running half-submerged, Orzeł ran aground on a bar at the harbour mouth, where artillery fire damaged her wireless equipment. Grudzinski managed to get the boat off the bar by blowing her tanks, and she proceeded out of the Gulf of Finland, intending to sail for a British port, the crew having heard a radio report that the Polish submarine  had been welcomed in Britain.

Orzel escaped from Tallinn with two Estonian guards on board as hostages. The Estonian and German press covering the Orzeł incident declared the two captured guards missing at sea. Grudzinski set them ashore in Sweden, providing them with clothing, money, and food for their safe return to homeland. The Polish crew believed that "those returning from the underworld deserve to travel first class only". The escape of the submarine Orzeł was used by the Soviet Union and Germany to challenge Estonian neutrality.

Since Orzełs navigational charts had all been removed by the Estonian authorities, Captain Grudzinski resolved to stop a German ship and take her charts. However, the only German vessels encountered were warships rather than merchantmen. The submarine's sole remaining navigational aid was a list of lighthouses, and using these as a reference, Orzeł followed a course along the Baltic coast, around Denmark, and out into the North Sea where she came under attack by British as well as German forces, since without her wireless equipment she had no means of identifying herself.

Forty days after she had originally sailed from Gdynia, Orzeł made landfall, off the east coast of Scotland. She lay on the bottom until emergency repairs were made to the radio, then surfaced to transmit a message in English. A Royal Navy destroyer then came out and escorted her into port, to the surprise of the British who had thought her sunk already weeks earlier.

Orzeł sank no enemy vessels during her journey from Estonia to Britain, but Soviet authorities blamed her for sinking the Soviet tanker Metallist in Narva Bay on 26 September, and used the incident as a pretext for the Soviet invasion of Estonia.

Norwegian Campaign

After a refit, Orzeł was assigned to the Royal Navy's 2nd Submarine Flotilla, and was assigned to patrol missions. Rio de Janeiro was heading to Bergen in order to take part in the initial landings of Operation Weserübung – the invasion of Norway and opening move of the Norwegian Campaign. News that several hundred German soldiers were rescued by the Norwegian Navy and some had admitted their intention to occupy Norway reached the Norwegian parliament that evening, but the news was dismissed and no steps were taken to alert their Navy or Coast Guard of the impending invasion. Two days later Orzeł fired a torpedo at a German minesweeper V 705; however, she was forced to dive before the sinking of the German ship could be confirmed. The ship was not damaged by the torpedoes.

Loss

On 23 May 1940, Orzeł departed on its seventh patrol in the central North Sea. On 1 and 2 June, radio messages were transmitted from the Rosyth Naval base ordering the boat to alter its patrol area and proceed to the Skagerrak (the strait separating Norway and Sweden from the Danish Jutland peninsula). No radio signals had been received from her since she had sailed, and on 5 June Orzeł was ordered to return to base. No reception was acknowledged. On 8 June 1940 the submarine was officially declared lost. The true cause is unknown, although it is commonly believed Orzeł most likely struck a British or German sea mine in or near the Skagerrak. Another theory suggests the boat may have been sunk mistakenly by a British aircraft.

Search for the wreck
Between 2008 and 2017 a number of Polish expeditions, both private and public-funded, searched the region of North Sea where she went missing with the hope of finding her final resting place. Wrecks of various other ships have been located, but Orzeł has not been among them and ultimately the fate of the ship remains unknown.

In June 2013 the Polish Navy, following reports of a wreck of an unknown large submarine found in the North Sea, conducted one more expedition to check whether the ship could be Orzeł. In 2017 another private expedition  found a previously unknown wreck which they identified to be most likely  based on sonar data.

On May 23, 2020, 80 years after Orzeł left on its final patrol, the Shipwreck Expeditions Association announced a partnership to search for the wreck in conjunction with the Maritime University of Szczecin with the assistance from the Chancellery of the Prime Minister of the Republic of Poland and the Ministry of Maritime Economy and Inland Navigation. 
The search is currently entering the logistics and preparations phase for the first expedition.

See also
 The Eagle (1959 film)

References

External links

 http://crolick.website.pl/orporzel/  
 Association of the "ORZEŁ" submarine search group 
 Uboat.net on Orzeł
 ORP Orzel, a concept album from Cold Fusion
 Shipwreck Expeditions Association 

Orzeł-class submarines
World War II submarines of Poland
Germany–Soviet Union relations
World War II shipwrecks in the North Sea
1938 ships
Maritime incidents in September 1939
Maritime incidents in May 1940
Missing submarines of World War II
Ships built in Vlissingen
Warships lost with all hands